Doug Aldrich (born February 19, 1964) is an American hard rock guitarist. He founded the band Burning Rain with Keith St. John in 1998 and has played with Whitesnake, Dio, Lion, Hurricane, House of Lords, Bad Moon Rising and Revolution Saints.  He is currently a member of The Dead Daisies.  He has also released several solo albums.  Doug toured with former Deep Purple bassist and vocalist Glenn Hughes' band in 2015. It was announced in early 2016 that he would be replacing Richard Fortus as guitarist of The Dead Daisies.

Biography 
Aldrich began playing guitar at age 11, inspired by his older sister's Jeff Beck albums. Aldrich's first guitar was a cheap Les Paul-copy purchased from a Sears catalog. Fresh out of high school, Aldrich met the girlfriend of Kiss drummer Eric Carr, who told him that he was the type of guitarist Kiss was looking for to replace Ace Frehley. He subsequently auditioned for Kiss in 1982 but the spot ultimately went to Vinnie Vincent. Aldrich said that although the members of Kiss treated him very well during the audition process, Gene Simmons told him to "lose this number" when Aldrich attempted to talk with him again months later.

Aldrich joined L.A. glam band Lion in 1983, recording two albums and one EP before the band broke up in 1989. He was briefly a member of Hurricane, replacing founding guitarist Robert Sarzo in 1989. He participated in the writing and recording of Slave to the Thrill (1990) before leaving the band.

In early 2014, Aldrich joined the critically acclaimed production show Raiding the Rock Vault at the Tropicana Las Vegas, where he performed six shows a week with other rock 'n' roll greats including Robin McAuley (formerly Survivor, MSG), John Payne (Asia), Howard Leese (Bad Company, Heart), Paul Shortino (Quiet Riot) and Andrew Freeman (Offspring), among others. As of late 2015 this collaboration was still on ongoing project.

During 2015, Aldrich joined the Glenn Hughes solo European tour as guitarist, along with drummer Pontus Engborg, to complete the power trio with Hughes on bass and vocals.

In late January 2016, it was announced that Aldrich would be replacing Richard Fortus as guitarist in The Dead Daisies, as Fortus will be participating in the Guns N' Roses reunion. As of late January 2016 Aldrich was in Nashville with The Dead Daisies, working on a follow-up album to Revolución (2015). As a member of The Dead Daisies Aldrich is being reunited with bassist Marco Mendoza; the two previously performed together in Whitesnake. In November 2016, Aldrich performed with The Dead Daisies on the Kiss Kruise VI event.

Equipment 

Aldrich was previously endorsed by Jackson Guitars. He used their Dinky and Soloist Superstrats as well as his own signature model which has bridge and neck position humbucking pickups were "Full-shred" pickups which Seymour Duncan specially wired. California-based Suhr Guitars currently offers Aldrich signature humbucking pickups. 

He plays various Gibson Les Pauls, Fender Stratocasters through Suhr/ Cameron hot-rodded Marshall JMPs and Vintage Modern amps. In 2016, Aldrich became an official endorsee of ESP Guitars. 

Aldrich sums up his philosophy of playing this way, "I'm not one of those guys that follows whatever is trendy. I'd rather do what I do best and do it to the best of my ability."

Discography

Other works 

1989 – One – Minoru Niihara
1989 – Cutting Air Act 1 – Air Pavilion
1996 – La Saga du Metal 7 – Melodique – Progressif
1997 (Japan) & 1999 (Europe) – Windows – Mike Vescera Project
1998 (Japan) & 2000 (Europe) – Ignition – Mark Boals
1999 – A Tribute to Early Van Halen – The Atomic Punks (Ralph Saenz)
1999 – Here Before – Stone
2000 – Mikazuki in Rock
2001 – Art of Mackin''' – Ghetto Dynasty
2001–2002 – Superhero & More... – Brian McKnight
2002 – (1989–2002) From There to Here – Brian McKnight
2003 – Wake the Nations – Ken Tamplin and Friends
2003 – Guitar Zeus 1 – Carmine Appice's Guitar Zeus
2003 – Sho（照）Twist Songs – Sera Masanori
2003 – Wild Souls – On The Road
2005 – The Real Thing – Christian Tolle
2007 – Live for Tomorrow – Marco Mendoza
2007 – Wolfman Jack's Halloween Special: Fun for Kids2007 – Jacaranda – Masanori Sera
2008 – Anthology – House of Lords
2009 – Play My Game – Tim "Ripper" Owens
2009 – Spirit of Christmas – Northern Light Orchestra
2009 – Conquering Heroes – Carmine Appice's Guitar Zeus
2009 – Stargazer – Stargazer
2009 – Pulling the Trigger – Cooper Inc.
2010 – Harder and Heavier – 60's British Invasion Goes Metal
2010 – Celebrate Christmas – Northern Light Orchestra
2011 – Oceana – Derek Sherinian
2013 – Artpop – Lady Gaga (guitar on "Manicure")
2013 – Living Like a Runaway – Lita Ford
2013 – Lions & Lambs – Alex De Rosso
2013 – Star Of The East – Northern Light Orchestra
2014 – I'm Not Your Suicide – Michael Sweet
2014 – On the Road – Wild Souls
2014 – Eye of the Nine – Eye of the Nine
2014 – Knights of Badassdom – Brendan McCreary
2014 – Songs from the Vault, Volume 2 – Raiding the Rock Vault
2014 – Yurica / Hanatan – The Flower of Dim World
2015 – Hard To Bleed – Phill Rocker
2015 – Rise of the Animal – Wolfpakk
2016 – Now and Then – Christian Tolle Project
2017 – Just A Lie – David Scott Cooper
2017 – Howling Wolves – Sera Masanori
2017 – Jake J and the Killjoys – Jake J and the Killjoys
2017 – Star Of The East – Northern Light Orchestra
2018 – All For Metal – Doro Pesch
2018 – Forever Warriors, Forever United – Doro Pesch
2018 – Dónde Terminaré – La Beriso 20 Años
2018 – Point Blank – Christian Tolle Project
2019 – You're The Voice – The Planet Rock All Stars
2019 – IRONBUNNY – Tettsui no Alternative
2020 – Truth in Unity – Chris Catena's Rock City Tribe
2020 – Shortino – Make a Wish Tribute albums Crossfire: A Salute to Stevie Ray Vaughan (1996)Forever Mod: A Tribute to Rod Stewart (1998)Little Guitars: A Tribute to Van Halen (2000)Bat Head Soup: A Tribute to Ozzy (2000)Metallic Assault: A Tribute to Metallica (2000)Tie Your MIX Down: A Tribute to Queen (2000)Stone Cold Queen: A Tribute to Queen (2001)One Way Street – Let the Tribute Do the Talkin': A Tribute to Aerosmith (2002)Spin the Bottle: An All-Star Tribute to KISS (2004)Metallic Attack: Metallica – The Ultimate Tribute (2004)We Salute You: A Tribute to AC/DC (2004)Numbers from the Beast: An All Star Salute to Iron Maiden (2004)An 80's Metal Tribute to Van Halen (2006)Butchering the Beatles: A Headbashing Tribute to the Beatles (2006)Flying High Again: Tribute to Ozzy Osbourne (2006)Frankie Banali & Friends: Led Zeppelin Tribute – 24/7/365 (2007)The Omnibus Album: This Is Guitar Gods (2007)Northern Light Orchestra: The Spirit of Christmas (2008)We Wish You a Metal Xmas and a Headbanging New Year (2011)A World with Heroes: KISS 40th Anniversary (Calling Dr. Love) (2013)Thriller: A Metal Tribute to Michael Jackson (2013)This Is Your Life: Tribute To Ronnie James Dio (2014)Super Tribute to Ozzy Osbourne:(Japanese Edition) (2014)The House is Rocking: A Tribute To Stevie Ray Vaughan (2015)Immortal Randy Rhoads: The Ultimate Tribute (2015)Moore Blues For Gary: A Tribute To Gary Moore By Bob Daisley And Friends (2018)

 Film and television 

 Friday the 13th: The Final Chapter Soundtrack (1984)
 The Wraith – Original Motion Picture Soundtrack (1986)
 The Transformers The Movie: Original Motion Picture Soundtrack (1986)
 Holiday Greetings From The Epic, Portrait And CBS Associated Families (1987)
 Digital Pinball: Last Gladiators (1995)
 Digital Pinball: Necronomicon (1996)
 Knights of Badassdom: Original Motion Picture Soundtrack (2014)
 Instruments of Destruction 1986 Transformers: The Movie 30th Anniversary (2016)
 Welcome to Daisyland: TV series soundtrack'' – The Dead Daisies (2019)

References

External links 

 
 Burning Rain official website
 Lion website
 Bad Moon Rising website

1964 births
Living people
Whitesnake members
American rock guitarists
American heavy metal guitarists
American male guitarists
Rhythm guitarists
Dio (band) members
Hurricane (band) members
20th-century American guitarists
The Dead Daisies members
21st-century American guitarists
Revolution Saints members
Burning Rain members